Lauren May Hemp (born 7 August 2000) is an English professional footballer who plays as a forward for Women's Super League club Manchester City and the England national team. She was named England Young Player of the Year in September 2016, 2017  and PFA Women's Young Player of the Year in 2018, 2019, 2020 and 2022. In 2022 she helped the Lionesses win the Euros.

Early life and career
Hemp grew up in North Walsham, Norfolk, where she attended Millfield Primary School and North Walsham High School. She took an interest in football at a young age and started playing for local club North Walsham Youth FC. Her youth career started in 2008 at Norwich City where her sister Amy also played. She played her final game for Norwich in 2015 but continued her association with the club for the 2015–16 season.

Club career
In 2016, after leaving Norwich City, Hemp joined Bristol City. On 10 September 2016, she made her senior debut for the Vixens and scored the team's third goal in a 4–1 win over Watford. On 19 March 2017, she made her first FA Women's Cup appearance, scoring two goals in a 5–0 win over Millwall Lionesses. In the 2017 Spring Series, Hemp made a total of four appearances, scoring one goal. In April 2018, she was named PFA Women's Young Player of the Year. She finished the 2017–18 season with nine goals in 24 appearances in all competitions. On 31 May 2018, Hemp signed with Manchester City.

International career
In February 2015, Hemp received her first call-up to the under-15 squad. In May 2017, she captained England at the UEFA Women's Under-17 Championship, scoring a goal in a 5–0 win over the Republic of Ireland. In September 2017, she was named Vauxhall England Young Player of the Year. In August 2018, she helped England under-20 finish third at the 2018 FIFA U-20 Women's World Cup.

Hemp made her senior England debut on 8 October 2019, coming on as an 86th-minute substitute for Beth Mead in a 1–0 friendly win against Portugal. On 27 May 2021, it was announced that she had been selected in the Great Britain women's Olympic football team for the 2020 Olympics.

In January 2020, Hemp was named by UEFA as one of the ten most promising young players in Europe. On 30 November 2021, she scored her first four goals for England, in a national record 20–0 win over Latvia. In June Hemp was included in the England squad which won the UEFA Women's Euro 2022. During the final it was Hemp's corner that was pressed home by teammate Chloe Kelly to create the winning second goal in front of over 87,000 spectators.

Personal life
As of 2022, Hemp was in a relationship with fellow footballer Ellie Butler, who currently plays for Coventry.

Career statistics

Club
.

International

Scores and results list England's goal tally first, score column indicates score after each Hemp goal.

Honours
Manchester City
FA Women's Cup: 2019–20
Women's League Cup: 2021–22

England U20
FIFA U-20 Women's World Cup third place: 2018

England

UEFA Women's Championship: 2022
Arnold Clark Cup: 2022, 2023

Individual
 UEFA Women's Under-17 Championship Team of the Tournament: 2017
 PFA Women's Young Player of the Year: 2017–18, 2019–20, 2020–21, 2021–22,
 PFA WSL Team of the Year: 2020–21, 2021–22
 Vauxhall England Young Player of the Year: 2017
 Freedom of the Town of North Walsham: 5 August 2022.
Freedom of the City of London (announced 1 August 2022)

References

External links

Profile at the Manchester City F.C. website
Profile at the Football Association website

Living people
2000 births
People from North Walsham
English women's footballers
England women's youth international footballers
England women's under-21 international footballers
England women's international footballers
Olympic footballers of Great Britain
Women's Super League players
Bristol Academy W.F.C. players
Manchester City W.F.C. players
Women's association football forwards
Footballers at the 2020 Summer Olympics
UEFA Women's Euro 2022 players
UEFA Women's Championship-winning players
LGBT association football players
English LGBT sportspeople
21st-century LGBT people